Darryl Yong (born on 26 April 1985) is a Singaporean actor.

Career
Yong was a contestant on Project SuperStar 2005 and Star Search 2010. Although he was eliminated in the Star Search Grand Finals he was one of seven of the top 10 finalists offered a contract by MediaCorp. He has since acted in both English and Chinese language productions by MediaCorp.

Yong graduated from Temasek Polytechnic with a diploma in law and management. He was a flight attendant with Singapore Airlines prior to entering the entertainment industry.

Filmography

References

External links
Profile on xin.msn.com

Living people
1985 births
Singaporean male television actors
Temasek Polytechnic alumni
Singaporean people of Chinese descent